Eilema inconspicualis is a moth of the subfamily Arctiinae. It was described by George Hamilton Kenrick in 1914. It is found on Madagascar.

References

inconspicualis
Moths described in 1914